The Irisbus Agora (previously known as Renault Agora, Karosa City Bus or Ikarus Agora) was a low-floor bus designed and built by Renault from 1995 to 2002,the date upon which it has been built by Irisbus, firstly a joint-venture with Fiat subsidiary IVECO from 1999, with Iveco engines. It has also been built by Czech-based Karosa under the Citybus name as a diesel-powered bus, Skoda as a trolleybus in Eastern European markets as the Škoda 24Tr Irisbus and Škoda 25Tr Irisbus, and by the Romanian-based Astra Bus.

On February 8, 2006, the last Irisbus Agora was delivered to RATP, being replaced in production by the Irisbus Citelis.

Range
The range consisted of:
 Standard 12-metre "S" version, available in one-, two- or three-door form
 Articulated 18-metre "L" version in three- or four-door form
 "Line" 12-metre version in one, two or three-door form (built from 1999). This version is distinct from the standard Agora by its engine layout, which is longitudinally-mounted (under the rear passenger seats) instead of being transversely mounted in the Agora S and L. That gives the Line version a slightly greater seating capacity and a better fuel economy over the S version. This version was briefly sold in the United Kingdom, in right hand drive.
 Intercity version called "Moovy" (unveiled in 2003) which was based on the Agora Line.

Operators
Over 11,000 were built, mainly for European operators. Right hand drive countries for English and Australian bus operators have 1 door only.

Europe
The RATP Group was the largest purchaser with over 2,500. Standard Agora buses have been used in Greece by Athens bus operator OASA in two versions: diesel and CNG.
In Spain the Agora (known as Renault/Irisbus Citybus) have been one of the most common buses in the 2000s and 2010s, with plenty of units in Málaga, Sevilla, Madrid, Valencia or Zaragoza from both Renault and Irisbus and also Standard and Long versions. 
In Czech Republic 321 Agora S (Citybus 12M) and 53 Agora L (Citybus 18M) were delivered to Prague and more than 350 buses to other Czech cities. They were manufactured in Karosa factory in Vysoké Mýto (today part of Iveco Bus).

United Kingdom
In England, 23 were bodied by Optare, the majority for Norfolk Green for its rural and urban services.

Australia
In Australia, a batch was ordered by King Brothers. Six Northcoast Bus & Coach bodied examples were delivered, however a larger order for Custom Coaches and Australian Bus Manufacturers bodied examples was reneged on and amongst the operators to purchase them were ACTION (20), Baxter's Bus Lines (5), Fearne's (5) and Thompsons Bus Service (5).

Gallery

References

Agora
Agora
Buses
Low-floor buses
Articulated buses
Tri-axle buses
Buses of France
Vehicles introduced in 1995